Below is a list of U.S. senators who have represented the State of New York in the United States Senate since 1789. The date of the start of the tenure is either the first day of the legislative term (senators who were elected regularly before the term began), or the day when they took the seat (U.S. senators who were elected in special elections to fill vacancies, or after the term began). New York's current U.S. senators are Democrats Chuck Schumer (serving since 1999, also serving as Senate Democratic Leader since 2017, and the longest serving senator in the state) and Kirsten Gillibrand (serving since 2009).

List of senators

|- style="height:2em"
! 1
| align=left | Philip Schuyler
|  | Pro-Admin.
| Jul 27, 1789 –Mar 3, 1791
| Elected in 1789.Lost re-election.
| 1
| 
| rowspan=3 | 1
| rowspan=3 | Elected in 1789.
| rowspan=4 nowrap | Jul 25, 1789 –May 23, 1796
| rowspan=3  | Pro-Admin.
| rowspan=4 align=right | Rufus King
! rowspan=4 | 1

|- style="height:2em"
! rowspan=5 | 2
| rowspan=5 align=left | Aaron Burr
| rowspan=2  | Anti-Admin.
| rowspan=5 nowrap | Mar 4, 1791 –Mar 3, 1797
| rowspan=5 | Elected in 1791.Lost re-election.
| rowspan=5 | 2
| 

|- style="height:2em"
| 

|- style="height:2em"
| rowspan=3  | Democratic-Republican
| 
| rowspan=14 | 2
| Re-elected in 1795.Resigned to become U.S. Minister to Great Britain.
|  | Federalist

|- style="height:2em"
| Vacant
| nowrap | May 23, 1796 –Dec 8, 1796
| colspan=3 | Vacant

|- style="height:2em"
| rowspan=10 | Elected to finish King's term.Resigned.
| rowspan=10 nowrap | Dec 8, 1796 –Aug 1800
| rowspan=10  | Federalist
| rowspan=10 align=right | John Laurance
! rowspan=10 | 2

|- style="height:2em"
! 3
| align=left | Philip Schuyler
|  | Federalist
| nowrap | Mar 4, 1797 –Jan 3, 1798
| Elected in 1797.Resigned due to ill health.
| rowspan=14 | 3
| 

|- style="height:2em"
| colspan=3 | Vacant
| nowrap | Jan 3, 1798 –Jan 11, 1798
| Vacant

|- style="height:2em"
! 4
| align=left | John Sloss Hobart
|  | Federalist
| nowrap | Jan 11, 1798 –Apr 16, 1798
| Elected to finish Schuyler's term.Resigned to become federal judge.

|- style="height:2em"
| colspan=3 | Vacant
| nowrap | Apr 16, 1798 –May 5, 1798
| Vacant

|- style="height:2em"
! 5
| align=left | William North
|  | Federalist
| nowrap | May 5, 1798 –Aug 17, 1798
| Appointed to continue Hobart's term.Successor elected.

|- style="height:2em"
! rowspan=2 | 6
| rowspan=2 align=left | James Watson
| rowspan=2  | Federalist
| rowspan=2 nowrap | Aug 17, 1798 –Mar 19, 1800
| rowspan=2 | Elected to finish Hobart's term.Resigned to become Naval Officer of the Port of New York.

|- style="height:2em"
| 

|- style="height:2em"
| colspan=3 | Vacant
| nowrap | Mar 19, 1800 –May 3, 1800
| Vacant

|- style="height:2em"
! rowspan=6 | 7
| rowspan=6 align=left | Gouverneur Morris
| rowspan=6  | Federalist
| rowspan=6 nowrap | May 3, 1800 –Mar 3, 1803
| rowspan=6 | Elected to finish Watson's term.Lost re-election.

|- style="height:2em"
| Vacant
| nowrap | Aug 1800 –Nov 6, 1800
| colspan=3 | Vacant

|- style="height:2em"
| Elected to finish Laurance's term.
| rowspan=2 nowrap | Nov 6, 1800 –Feb 5, 1802
| rowspan=2  | Democratic-Republican
| rowspan=2 align=right | John Armstrong Jr.
! rowspan=2 | 3

|- style="height:2em"
| 
| rowspan=12 | 3
| Re-elected in 1801.Resigned.

|- style="height:2em"
| Vacant
| nowrap | Feb 5, 1802 –Feb 23, 1802
| colspan=3 | Vacant

|- style="height:2em"
| rowspan=2 | Elected to finish Armstrong's term.Resigned.
| rowspan=2 nowrap | Feb 23, 1802 –Nov 4, 1803
| rowspan=2  | Democratic-Republican
| rowspan=2 align=right | DeWitt Clinton
! rowspan=2 | 4

|- style="height:2em"
! rowspan=3 | 8
| rowspan=3 align=left | Theodorus Bailey
| rowspan=3  | Democratic-Republican
| rowspan=3 nowrap | Mar 4, 1803 –Jan 16, 1804
| rowspan=3 | Elected in 1803.Resigned.
| rowspan=10 | 4
| 

|- style="height:2em"
| Vacant
| nowrap | Nov 4, 1803 –Dec 8, 1803
| colspan=3 | Vacant

|- style="height:2em"
| rowspan=2 | Appointed to continue Clinton's term.Resigned; Elected to the Class 1 seat.
| rowspan=2 nowrap | Dec 8, 1803 –Feb 23, 1804
| rowspan=2  | Democratic-Republican
| rowspan=2 align=right | John Armstrong Jr.
! rowspan=2 | 5

|- style="height:2em"
| rowspan=2 colspan=3 | Vacant
| rowspan=2 nowrap | Jan 16, 1804 –Feb 25, 1804
| rowspan=2 | Vacant

|- style="height:2em"
| rowspan=5 | Elected to finish Armstrong's term.
| rowspan=8 nowrap | Feb 23, 1804 –Mar 3, 1813
| rowspan=8  | Democratic-Republican
| rowspan=8 align=right | John Smith
! rowspan=8 | 6

|- style="height:2em"
! 9
| align=left | John Armstrong Jr.
|  | Democratic-Republican
| nowrap | Feb 25, 1804 –Jun 30, 1804
| Elected to finish Bailey's term.Resigned to become U.S. Minister to France.

|- style="height:2em"
| colspan=3 | Vacant
| nowrap | Jun 30, 1804 –Nov 23, 1804
| Vacant

|- style="height:2em"
! rowspan=3 | 10
| rowspan=3 align=left | Samuel L. Mitchill
| rowspan=3  | Democratic-Republican
| rowspan=3 nowrap | Nov 23, 1804 –Mar 3, 1809
| rowspan=3 | Elected to finish Armstrong's term.Lost re-election.

|- style="height:2em"
| 

|- style="height:2em"
| 
| rowspan=3 | 4
| rowspan=3 | Re-elected in 1807.Retired or lost re-election.

|- style="height:2em"
! rowspan=3 | 11
| rowspan=3 align=left | Obadiah German
| rowspan=3  | Democratic-Republican
| rowspan=3 nowrap | Mar 4, 1809 –Mar 3, 1815
| rowspan=3 | Elected in 1809.Retired.
| rowspan=3 | 5
| 

|- style="height:2em"
| 

|- style="height:2em"
| 
| rowspan=3 | 5
| rowspan=3 | Elected in 1813.Legislature failed to elect.
| rowspan=3 nowrap | Mar 4, 1813 –Mar 3, 1819
| rowspan=3  | Federalist
| rowspan=3 align=right | Rufus King
! rowspan=7 | 7

|- style="height:2em"
! rowspan=4 | 12
| rowspan=4 align=left | Nathan Sanford
| rowspan=4  | Democratic-Republican
| rowspan=4 nowrap | Mar 4, 1815 –Mar 3, 1821
| rowspan=4 | Elected in 1815.Lost re-election.
| rowspan=4 | 6
| 

|- style="height:2em"
| 

|- style="height:2em"
| 
| rowspan=4 | 6
| Vacant
| nowrap | Mar 4, 1819 –Jan 25, 1820
| colspan=2 | Vacant

|- style="height:2em"
| rowspan=3 | Re-elected late.Retired.
| rowspan=3 nowrap | Jan 25, 1820 –Mar 3, 1825
| rowspan=3  | Federalist
| rowspan=3 align=right | Rufus King

|- style="height:2em"
! rowspan=5 | 13
| rowspan=5 align=left | Martin Van Buren
| rowspan=2  | Democratic-Republican/Bucktail
| rowspan=5 nowrap | Mar 4, 1821 –Dec 20, 1828
| rowspan=4 | Elected in 1821.
| rowspan=4 | 7
| 

|- style="height:2em"
| 

|- style="height:2em"
| rowspan=3  | Jacksonian
| 
| rowspan=6 | 7
| Legislature failed to elect.
| nowrap | Mar 4, 1825 –Jan 31, 1826
| colspan=3 | Vacant

|- style="height:2em"
| rowspan=5 | Elected late.Retired.
| rowspan=5 nowrap | Jan 31, 1826 –Mar 3, 1831
| rowspan=5  | NationalRepublican
| rowspan=5 align=right | Nathan Sanford
! rowspan=5 | 8

|- style="height:2em"
| Re-elected in 1827.Resigned to become N.Y. Governor.
| rowspan=7 | 8
| 

|- style="height:2em"
| colspan=3 | Vacant
| nowrap | Dec 20, 1828 –Jan 15, 1829
| Vacant

|- style="height:2em"
! rowspan=5 | 14
| rowspan=5 align=left | Charles E. Dudley
| rowspan=5  | Jacksonian
| rowspan=5 nowrap | Jan 15, 1829 –Mar 3, 1833
| rowspan=5 | Elected to finish Van Buren's term.Retired or lost re-election.

|- style="height:2em"
| 

|- style="height:2em"
| 
| rowspan=5 | 8
| Elected in 1831.Resigned; elected N.Y. Governor.
| nowrap | Mar 4, 1831 –Jan 1, 1833
|  | Jacksonian
| align=right | William L. Marcy
! 9

|- style="height:2em"
| Vacant
| nowrap | Jan 1, 1833 –Jan 14, 1833
| colspan=3 | Vacant

|- style="height:2em"
| rowspan=3 | Elected to finish Marcy's term.
| rowspan=9 nowrap | Jan 4, 1833 –Nov 26, 1844
| rowspan=3  | Jacksonian
| rowspan=9 align=right | Silas Wright Jr.
! rowspan=9 | 10

|- style="height:2em"
! rowspan=7 | 15
| rowspan=3 align=left | Nathaniel P. Tallmadge
| rowspan=2  | Jacksonian
| rowspan=3 nowrap | Mar 4, 1833 –Mar 3, 1839
| rowspan=3 | Elected in 1833.Legislature failed to re-elect.
| rowspan=3 | 9
| 

|- style="height:2em"
| 

|- style="height:2em"
|  | Democratic
| 
| rowspan=4 | 9
| rowspan=4 | Re-elected in 1837.
| rowspan=6  | Democratic

|- style="height:2em"
| colspan=2 | Vacant
| nowrap | Mar 4, 1839 –Jan 27, 1840
| Vacant
| rowspan=9 | 10
| 

|- style="height:2em"
| rowspan=3 align=left | Nathaniel P. Tallmadge
| rowspan=3  | Whig
| rowspan=3 nowrap | Jan 27, 1840 –Jun 17, 1844
| rowspan=3 | Elected late.Resigned to become Governor of Wisconsin Territory.

|- style="height:2em"
| 

|- style="height:2em"
| 
| rowspan=8 | 10
| rowspan=2 | Re-elected in 1843.Resigned when elected N.Y. Governor.

|- style="height:2em"
| rowspan=3 colspan=3 | Vacant
| rowspan=3 nowrap | Jun 17, 1844 –Dec 9, 1844
| rowspan=3 | Vacant

|- style="height:2em"
| Vacant
| nowrap | Nov 26, 1844 –Nov 30, 1844
| colspan=3 | Vacant

|- style="height:2em"
| rowspan=2 | Appointed to continue Wright's term.Lost election for remainder of Wright's term.
| rowspan=2 nowrap | Nov 30, 1844 –Jan 27, 1845
| rowspan=2  | Democratic
| rowspan=2 align=right | Henry A. Foster
! rowspan=2 | 11

|- style="height:2em"
! rowspan=5 | 16
| rowspan=5 align=left | Daniel S. Dickinson
| rowspan=5  | Democratic
| rowspan=5 nowrap | Dec 9, 1844 –Mar 3, 1851
| rowspan=2 | Appointed to continue Tallmadge's term.Elected to finish Tallmadge's term.

|- style="height:2em"
| rowspan=3 | Elected to finish Wright's term.Lost re-election.
| rowspan=3 nowrap | Jan 27, 1845 –Mar 3, 1849
| rowspan=3  | Democratic
| rowspan=3 align=right | John Adams Dix
! rowspan=3 | 12

|- style="height:2em"
| rowspan=3 | Elected to full term in 1845.Lost re-election.
| rowspan=3 | 11
| 

|- style="height:2em"
| 

|- style="height:2em"
| 
| rowspan=4 | 11
| rowspan=4 | Elected in 1849.
| rowspan=7 nowrap | Mar 4, 1849 –Mar 3, 1861
| rowspan=4  | Whig
| rowspan=7 align=right | William H. Seward
! rowspan=7 | 13

|- style="height:2em"
| colspan=3 | Vacant
| nowrap | Mar 4, 1851 –Dec 1, 1851
| Vacant
| rowspan=4 | 12
| 

|- style="height:2em"
! rowspan=3 | 17
| rowspan=3 nowrap align=left | Hamilton Fish
| rowspan=3  | Whig
| rowspan=3 nowrap | Dec 1, 1851 –Mar 3, 1857
| rowspan=3 | Elected late.Retired.

|- style="height:2em"
| 

|- style="height:2em"
| 
| rowspan=3 | 12
| rowspan=3 | Re-elected in 1855.Retired to become Secretary of State
| rowspan=3  | Republican

|- style="height:2em"
! rowspan=3 | 18
| rowspan=3 align=left | Preston King
| rowspan=3  | Republican
| rowspan=3 nowrap | Mar 4, 1857 –Mar 3, 1863
| rowspan=3 | Elected in 1857.Lost renomination.
| rowspan=3 | 13
| 

|- style="height:2em"
| 

|- style="height:2em"
| 
| rowspan=3 | 13
| rowspan=3 | Elected in 1861.Lost re-nomination.
| rowspan=3 nowrap | Mar 4, 1861 –Mar 3, 1867
| rowspan=3  | Republican
| rowspan=3 align=right | Ira Harris
! rowspan=3 | 14

|- style="height:2em"
! rowspan=3 | 19
| rowspan=3 align=left | Edwin D. Morgan
| rowspan=3  | Republican
| rowspan=3 nowrap | Mar 4, 1863 –Mar 3, 1869
| rowspan=3 | Elected in 1863.Lost re-nomination.
| rowspan=3 | 14
| 

|- style="height:2em"
| 

|- style="height:2em"
| 
| rowspan=4 | 14
| rowspan=4 | Elected in 1867.
| rowspan=9 nowrap | Mar 4, 1867 –May 16, 1881
| rowspan=9  | Republican
| rowspan=9 align=right | Roscoe Conkling
! rowspan=9 | 15

|- style="height:2em"
! rowspan=4 | 20
| rowspan=4 align=left | Reuben Fenton
| rowspan=2  | Republican
| rowspan=4 nowrap | Mar 4, 1869 –Mar 3, 1875
| rowspan=4 | Elected in 1869.Not an active candidate for renomination in 1875.
| rowspan=4 | 15
| 

|- style="height:2em"
| 

|-style="height:2em"
|  | Liberal Republican

|- style="height:2em"
|  | Republican
| 
| rowspan=3 | 15
| rowspan=3 | Re-elected in 1873.

|- style="height:2em"
! rowspan=3 | 21
| rowspan=3 align=left | Francis Kernan
| rowspan=3  | Democratic
| rowspan=3 nowrap | Mar 4, 1875 –Mar 3, 1881
| rowspan=3 | Elected in 1875.Lost re-election.
| rowspan=3 | 16
| 

|- style="height:2em"
| 

|- style="height:2em"
| 
| rowspan=5 | 16
| rowspan=2 | Re-elected in 1879.Resigned.

|- style="height:2em"
! 22
| align=left | Thomas C. Platt
|  | Republican
| nowrap | Mar 4, 1881 –May 16, 1881
| Elected in 1881.Resigned.
| rowspan=5 | 17
| 

|- style="height:2em"
| colspan=3 | Vacant
| nowrap | May 16, 1881 –Jul 27, 1881
| Vacant
| Vacant
| nowrap | May 16, 1881 –Jul 29, 1881
| colspan=3 | Vacant

|- style="height:2em"
! rowspan=3 | 23
| rowspan=3 align=left | Warner Miller
| rowspan=3  | Republican
| rowspan=3 nowrap | Jul 27, 1881 –Mar 3, 1887
| rowspan=3 | Elected to finish Platt's term.Lost re-election.
| rowspan=2 | Elected to finish Conkling's term.Retired.
| rowspan=2 nowrap | Jul 29, 1881 –Mar 3, 1885
| rowspan=2  | Republican
| rowspan=2 align=right | Elbridge G. Lapham
! rowspan=2 | 16

|- style="height:2em"
| 

|- style="height:2em"
| 
| rowspan=3 | 17
| rowspan=3 | Elected in 1885.Lost re-election.
| rowspan=3 nowrap | Mar 4, 1885 –Mar 3, 1891
| rowspan=3  | Republican
| rowspan=3 align=right | William M. Evarts
! rowspan=3 | 17

|- style="height:2em"
! rowspan=4 | 24
| rowspan=4 align=left | Frank Hiscock
| rowspan=4  | Republican
| rowspan=4 nowrap | Mar 4, 1887 –Mar 3, 1893
| rowspan=4 | Elected in 1887.Lost re-election.
| rowspan=4 | 18
| 

|- style="height:2em"
| 

|- style="height:2em"
| 
| rowspan=4 | 18
| Vacant
| nowrap | Mar 4, 1891 –Jan 7, 1892
| colspan=3 | Vacant

|- style="height:2em"
| rowspan=3 | Elected in 1891, but took his seat only after term as N.Y. Governor ended.Lost re-election.
| rowspan=3 nowrap | Jan 7, 1892 –Mar 3, 1897
| rowspan=3  | Democratic
| rowspan=3 align=right | David B. Hill
! rowspan=3 | 18

|- style="height:2em"
! rowspan=3 | 25
| rowspan=3 align=left | Edward Murphy Jr.
| rowspan=3  | Democratic
| rowspan=3 nowrap | Mar 4, 1893 –Mar 3, 1899
| rowspan=3 | Elected in 1893.Lost re-election.
| rowspan=3 | 19
| 

|- style="height:2em"
| 

|- style="height:2em"
| 
| rowspan=3 | 19
| rowspan=3 | Elected Jan 20, 1897.
| rowspan=6 nowrap | Mar 4, 1897 –Mar 3, 1909
| rowspan=6  | Republican
| rowspan=6 align=right | Thomas C. Platt
! rowspan=6 | 19

|- style="height:2em"
! rowspan=6 | 26
| rowspan=6 align=left | Chauncey Depew
| rowspan=6  | Republican
| rowspan=6 nowrap | Mar 4, 1899 –Mar 3, 1911
| rowspan=3 | Elected in 1899.
| rowspan=3 | 20
| 

|- style="height:2em"
| 

|- style="height:2em"
| 
| rowspan=3 | 20
| rowspan=3 | Re-elected Jan 20, 1903.Retired.

|- style="height:2em"
| rowspan=3 | Re-elected in 1905.Lost re-election.
| rowspan=3 | 21
| 

|- style="height:2em"
| 

|- style="height:2em"
| 
| rowspan=4 | 21
| rowspan=4 | Elected Jan 19, 1909.Retired.
| rowspan=4 nowrap | Mar 4, 1909 –Mar 3, 1915
| rowspan=4  | Republican
| rowspan=4 align=right | Elihu Root
! rowspan=4 | 20

|- style="height:2em"
| colspan=3 | Vacant
| nowrap | Mar 3, 1911 –Apr 4, 1911
| Vacant
| rowspan=4 | 22
| 

|- style="height:2em"
! rowspan=3 | 27
| rowspan=3 align=left | James A. O'Gorman
| rowspan=3  | Democratic
| rowspan=3 nowrap | Apr 4, 1911 –Mar 3, 1917
| rowspan=3 | Elected Mar 31, 1911.Retired.

|- style="height:2em"
| 

|- style="height:2em"
| 
| rowspan=3 | 22
| rowspan=3 | Elected in 1914.
| rowspan=6 nowrap | Mar 4, 1915 –Mar 3, 1927
| rowspan=6  | Republican
| rowspan=6 align=right | James W. Wadsworth Jr.
! rowspan=6 | 21

|- style="height:2em"
! rowspan=3 | 28
| rowspan=3 align=left | William M. Calder
| rowspan=3  | Republican
| rowspan=3 nowrap | Mar 4, 1917 –Mar 3, 1923
| rowspan=3 | Elected in 1916.Lost re-election.
| rowspan=3 | 23
| 

|- style="height:2em"
| 

|- style="height:2em"
| 
| rowspan=3 | 23
| rowspan=3 | Re-elected in 1920.Lost re-election.

|- style="height:2em"
! rowspan=8 | 29
| rowspan=8 align=left | Royal S. Copeland
| rowspan=8  | Democratic
| rowspan=8 nowrap | Mar 4, 1923 –Jun 17, 1938
| rowspan=3 | Elected in 1922.
| rowspan=3 | 24
| 

|- style="height:2em"
| 

|- style="height:2em"
| 
| rowspan=3 | 24
| rowspan=3 | Elected in 1926.
| rowspan=14 nowrap | Mar 4, 1927 –Jun 28, 1949
| rowspan=14  | Democratic
| rowspan=14 align=right | Robert F. Wagner
! rowspan=14 | 22

|- style="height:2em"
| rowspan=3 | Re-elected in 1928.
| rowspan=3 | 25
| 

|- style="height:2em"
| 

|- style="height:2em
| 
| rowspan=5 | 25
| rowspan=5 | Re-elected in 1932.

|- style="height:2em"
| rowspan=2 | Re-elected in 1934.Died.
| rowspan=5 | 26
| 

|- style="height:2em"
| 

|- style="height:2em"
| colspan=3 | Vacant
| nowrap | Jun 17, 1938 –Dec 3, 1938
| Vacant

|- style="height:2em"
! rowspan=5 | 30
| rowspan=5 align=left | James M. Mead
| rowspan=5  | Democratic
| rowspan=5 nowrap | Dec 3, 1938 –Jan 3, 1947
| rowspan=2 | Elected to finish Copeland's term.

|- style="height:2em"
| 
| rowspan=3 | 26
| rowspan=3 | Re-elected in 1938.

|- style="height:2em"
| rowspan=3 | Re-elected in 1940.Retired to run for N.Y. Governor.
| rowspan=3 | 27
| 

|- style="height:2em"
| 

|- style="height:2em"
| 
| rowspan=6 | 27
| rowspan=3 | Re-elected in 1944.Resigned due to ill health.

|- style="height:2em"
! rowspan=10 | 31
| rowspan=10 align=left | Irving Ives
| rowspan=10  | Republican
| rowspan=10 nowrap | Jan 3, 1947 –Jan 3, 1959
| rowspan=6 | Elected in 1946.
| rowspan=6 | 28
| 

|- style="height:2em"
| 

|- style="height:2em"
| Vacant
| nowrap | Jun 28, 1949 –Jul 7, 1949
| colspan=3 | Vacant

|- style="height:2em"
| Appointed to continue Wagner's term.Lost election to finish Wagner's term.
| nowrap | Jul 7, 1949 –Nov 8, 1949
|  | Republican
| align=right | John Foster Dulles
! 23

|- style="height:2em"
| Elected to finish Wagner's term.
| rowspan=4 nowrap | Nov 9, 1949 –Jan 3, 1957
| rowspan=4  | Democratic
| rowspan=4 align=right | Herbert H. Lehman
! rowspan=4 | 24

|- style="height:2em"
| 
| rowspan=3 | 28
| rowspan=3 | Re-elected in 1950.Retired.

|- style="height:2em"
| rowspan=4 | Re-elected in 1952.Retired.
| rowspan=4 | 29
| 

|- style="height:2em"
| 

|- style="height:2em"
| 
| rowspan=4 | 29
| Vacant
| nowrap | Jan 3, 1957 –Jan 9, 1957
| colspan=3 | Vacant

|- style="height:2em"
| rowspan=3 | Elected in 1956, but took seat late to remain N.Y. Attorney General.
| rowspan=15 nowrap | Jan 9, 1957 –Jan 3, 1981
| rowspan=15  | Republican
| rowspan=15 align=right | Jacob Javits
! rowspan=15 | 25

|- style="height:2em"
! rowspan=3 | 32
| rowspan=3 align=left | Kenneth Keating
| rowspan=3  | Republican
| rowspan=3 nowrap | Jan 3, 1959 –Jan 3, 1965
| rowspan=3 | Elected in 1958.Lost re-election.
| rowspan=3 | 30
| 

|- style="height:2em"
| 

|- style="height:2em"
| 
| rowspan=5 | 30
| rowspan=5 | Re-elected in 1962.

|- style="height:2em"
! rowspan=2 | 33
| rowspan=2 align=left | Robert F. Kennedy
| rowspan=2  | Democratic
| rowspan=2 nowrap | Jan 3, 1965 –Jun 6, 1968
| rowspan=2 | Elected in 1964.Died.
| rowspan=5 | 31
| 

|- style="height:2em"
| 

|- style="height:2em"
| colspan=3 | Vacant
| nowrap | Jun 6, 1968 –Sep 10, 1968
| Vacant

|- style="height:2em"
! rowspan=2 | 34
| rowspan=2 align=left | Charles Goodell
| rowspan=2  | Republican
| rowspan=2 nowrap | Sep 10, 1968 –Jan 3, 1971
| rowspan=2 | Appointed to finish Kennedy's term.Lost election to a full term.

|- style="height:2em"
| 
| rowspan=3 | 31
| rowspan=3 | Re-elected in 1968.

|- style="height:2em"
! rowspan=4 | 35
| rowspan=4 align=left | James L. Buckley
| rowspan=3  | Conservative
| rowspan=4 nowrap | Jan 3, 1971 –Jan 3, 1977
| rowspan=4 | Elected in 1970.Changed parties in 1976.Lost re-election.
| rowspan=4 | 32
| 

|- style="height:2em"
| 

|- style="height:2em"
| 
| rowspan=4 | 32
| rowspan=4 | Re-elected in 1974.Lost renomination and then lost re-election as a Liberal.

|-
|  | Republican

|- style="height:2em"
! rowspan=12 | 36
| rowspan=12 align=left | Daniel Patrick Moynihan
| rowspan=12  | Democratic
| rowspan=12 nowrap | Jan 3, 1977 –Jan 3, 2001
| rowspan=3 | Elected in 1976.
| rowspan=3 | 33
| 

|- style="height:2em"
| 

|- style="height:2em"
| 
| rowspan=3 | 33
| rowspan=3 | Elected in 1980.
| rowspan=9 nowrap | Jan 3, 1981 –Jan 3, 1999
| rowspan=9  | Republican
| rowspan=9 align=right | Al D'Amato
! rowspan=9 | 26

|- style="height:2em"
| rowspan=3 | Re-elected in 1982.
| rowspan=3 | 34
| 

|- style="height:2em"
| 

|- style="height:2em"
| 
| rowspan=3 | 34
| rowspan=3 | Re-elected in 1986.

|- style="height:2em"
| rowspan=3 | Re-elected in 1988.
| rowspan=3 | 35
| 

|- style="height:2em"
| 

|- style="height:2em"
| 
| rowspan=3 | 35
| rowspan=3 | Re-elected in 1992.Lost re-election.

|- style="height:2em"
| rowspan=3 | Re-elected in 1994.Retired.
| rowspan=3 | 36
| 

|- style="height:2em"
| 

|- style="height:2em"
| 
| rowspan=3 | 36
| rowspan=3 | Elected in 1998.
| rowspan=17 nowrap | Jan 3, 1999 –Present
| rowspan=17  | Democratic
| rowspan=17 align=right | Chuck Schumer
! rowspan=17 | 27

|- style="height:2em"
! rowspan=5 | 37
| rowspan=5 align=left | Hillary Clinton
| rowspan=5  | Democratic
| rowspan=5 nowrap | Jan 3, 2001 –Jan 21, 2009
| rowspan=3 | Elected in 2000.
| rowspan=3 | 37
| 

|- style="height:2em"
| 

|- style="height:2em"
| 
| rowspan=5 | 37
| rowspan=5 | Re-elected in 2004.

|- style="height:2em"
| rowspan=2 | Re-elected in 2006.Resigned to become U.S. Secretary of State.
| rowspan=5 | 38
| 

|- style="height:2em"
| 

|- style="height:2em"
| colspan=3 | Vacant
| nowrap | Jan 21, 2009 –Jan 26, 2009
| Vacant

|- style="height:2em"
! rowspan=8 | 38
| rowspan=8 align=left | Kirsten Gillibrand
| rowspan=8  | Democratic
| rowspan=8 nowrap | Jan 26, 2009 –Present
| rowspan=2 | Appointed to continue Clinton's term.Elected in 2010 to finish Clinton's term.

|- style="height:2em"
| 
| rowspan=3 | 38
| rowspan=3 | Re-elected in 2010.

|- style="height:2em"
| rowspan=3 | Re-elected in 2012.
| rowspan=3 | 39
| 

|- style="height:2em"
| 

|- style="height:2em"
| 
| rowspan=3 | 39
| rowspan=3 | Re-elected in 2016.

|- style="height:2em"
| rowspan=3 | Re-elected in 2018.
| rowspan=3 | 40
| 

|- style="height:2em"
| 

|- style="height:2em"
| 
| rowspan=3 | 40
| rowspan=3 | Re-elected in 2022.

|- style="height:2em"
| rowspan=3 colspan=5 | To be determined in the 2024 election.
| rowspan=3| 41
| 

|- style="height:2em"
| 

|- style="height:2em"
| 
| 41
| colspan=5 | To be determined in the 2028 election.

See also

 List of United States representatives from New York
 United States congressional delegations from New York
 Elections in New York

Notes

References

 

 
United States Senators
New York